Gol Afshan or Golafshan may refer to:
 Golafshan, Isfahan
 Gol Afshan, Mazandaran
 Gol Afshan, Yazd